María Luisa Porcel Montijano (15 November 1943 – 15 August 2018) was a Spanish stage, film and television actress.

Selected filmography
 The Garden of Delights (1970)
 Habla, mudita (1973)
 Spanish Fly (1975)
 Black Litter (1977)
 La moglie in bianco... l'amante al pepe (1980)

References

Bibliography
 Cowie, Peter. International Film Guide 1978. Tantivy Press, 1977.

External links

1943 births
2018 deaths
Spanish television actresses
Spanish film actresses
People from Zaragoza
20th-century Spanish actresses
21st-century Spanish actresses